Ullubiyaul (Ullu Boynaq) is a rural locality (a selo) in Karabudakhkentsky District, Republic of Dagestan, Russia. The population was 3,666 as of 2010. There are 39 streets.

Geography 
Ullubiyaul is located 42 km northwest of Novokayakent (the district's administrative centre) by road. Achi-Su and Achi are the nearest rural localities.

Nationalities 
Kumyks live there.

Famous residents 
 Ulluby Buynaksky (revolutionary leader of Dagestan)
 Abdurakhman Shiravov (participant of the Great Patriotic War, full holder of the Order of Glory)

References 

Rural localities in Karabudakhkentsky District